The 3rd Infantry Division (Abbr.: 3 DIV) is a division-sized combined arms formation of the Malaysian Army. Its headquarters are in Terendak Camp, Malacca, and it is in charge of defending the south of the Malay peninsula, which includes Malacca, Negeri Sembilan, Johor, and Pahang.

Major General Dato' Tengku Muhammad Fauzi Tengku Ibrahim is the current commander of 3 DIV.

History

Formed as an infantry division 
Founded as an infantry division on 28 December 1976, during communist insurgency, 3 DIV was tasked with defending the Malay peninsula alongside the 2nd Infantry Division (2 DIV) and 11th Infantry Division (11 DIV). At the time, 2 DIV headquarters were based at Sungai Besi Army Base and were in charge of the Malay peninsula's northern region. The 2 DIV was then relocated to Penang, while the 4th Infantry Division was created for the Malay Peninsula's eastern region. Instead, the 11 DIV was reorganised into an army reserve combat formation. Since then, the 3 DIV has been responsible for four states: Malacca, Negeri Sembilan, Johor, and Pahang.

Restructure as a combined arms division 
When armoured and artillery combat elements were added, 3 DIV was reorganised as a combined arms division. They are the first Malaysian Army's infantry division to do so. Despite the fact that it is no longer a pure infantry division, the 3rd Infantry Division retains its original name.

Organisation 
3rd Infantry Division combat brigades:

 1st Infantry Brigade
 4th Mechanised Brigade
 7th Infantry Brigade
 3rd Division Artillery 

3rd Infantry Division units:

 5th Battalion, Royal Malay Regiment (5 RAMD)
 10th Battalion, Royal Malay Regiment (10 RAMD)
 14th Battalion (Mechanised), Royal Malay Regiment (14 RAMD (MEK))
 24th Battalion, Royal Malay Regiment (24 RAMD)
 2nd Regiment, Royal Armoured Corps (2 KAD)
 11th Regiment, Royal Armoured Corps (11 KAD)
 1st Squadron, Royal Signals Regiment (1 SSB)
 3rd Battalion, Royal Signals Regiment (3 RSD)
 2nd Regiment, Royal Artillery Regiment (2 RAD)
 3rd Regiment, Royal Military Police Corps (3 KPTD)
 508th Regiment, Territorial Army (REJ 508 AW)
 73rd Workshop, Royal Ordnance Corps (73 WKSP)
 4th Mechanised Brigade Workshop (4 WKSP BGD (MEK))
 7th Infantry Brigade Workshop (7 WKSP BGD)
 1st Company (Supply), Royal Logistics Corps (1 KOMP KPD/ PL BEKALAN)
 7th Company (Supply), Royal Logistics Corps (7 KOMP KPD/ PL BEKALAN)

References 

Malaysian Army
Formations of the Malaysian Army